Syren may refer to:
 Syrén, a Swedish family name
 Syren (band), an alternative band
 Syren (book), the fifth book in the fantasy Septimus Heap series by Angie Sage
 Syren, Luxembourg, a small town in the commune of Weiler-la-Tour, in southern Luxembourg
 Syren River, a river in Ukraine, a tributary of Horyn River

People
 Syren Hall, a stage name of Canadian recording artist Melanie Fiona
 Håkan Syrén (born 1952), a General of the Swedish Amphibious Corps and chairman of the European Union Military Committee

Ships
 SS Syren, a Confederate blockade runner, noted for its successes during the American Civil War. 
 Syren (clipper), a U.S. clipper ship
 HMS Syren, the name of four ships of the Royal Navy
 USS Syren (1803), a brig of the United States Navy during the First Barbary War and the War of 1812

See also 
 Siren (disambiguation)